Anthony David Kenworthy (born 30 October 1958) is an English former footballer who played as a central defender in the Football League for Sheffield United and Mansfield Town.

Football career 
Kenworthy served his apprenticeship with Sheffield United and made his league debut for the Blades at Norwich City in April 1976. During his early days, he won England youth/U21 honours, captaining England. He played for Sheffield United for 13 years again captaining the club and made 357 appearances in all competitions with 39 goals, which is the most by a defender in Sheffield United's history. In 1986, he signed for Mansfield Town, where he made 100 league appearances and scored the winning penalty to defeat Bristol City in the Football League Trophy final at Wembley in 1987.

In 1998, he replaced Danny Bergara for a short spell as manager of Grantham Town.

References

1958 births
Living people
Footballers from Leeds
English footballers
Association football defenders
Sheffield United F.C. players
Mansfield Town F.C. players
Ashfield United F.C. players
Oakham United F.C. (Nottinghamshire) players
English Football League players
English football managers
Grantham Town F.C. managers
Football managers from Leeds